Terra is a blockchain protocol and payment platform used for algorithmic stablecoins. The project was created in 2018 by Terraform Labs, a startup co-founded by Do Kwon and Daniel Shin. It is most known for its Terra stablecoin and the associated Luna reserve asset cryptocurrency.

In May 2022, the Terra blockchain was temporarily halted after the collapse of the stablecoin TerraUSD (UST) and Luna, in an event that wiped out almost $45billion in market capitalisation within a week.

Design 
Terra is a blockchain that leverages fiat-pegged stablecoins to power a payment system.  For consensus the Terra blockchain uses a proof-of-stake codesign. Several stablecoins are built atop the Terra protocol, including TerraUSD, which was the third largest stablecoin by market capitalisation before its collapse in May 2022. The Terra blockchain has a fully functional ecosystem of Dapps such as Anchor, Mirror, and Pylon which has utilised the stable-coin infrastructure of Terra.

Terra is a group of algorithmic stablecoins, named according to the currencies to which they are pegged—for example, TerraUSD (UST) is pegged to the U.S. dollar. Luna serves as the primary backing asset for Terra, and is also used as a governance token for users to vote on Terra community proposals. UST stablecoins were not backed by U.S. dollars; instead, it was designed to maintain its peg through a complex model called a "burn and mint equilibrium". This method uses a two-token system, whereby one token is supposed to remain stable (UST) while the other token (LUNA) is meant to absorb volatility.

The Anchor Protocol was a lending and borrowing protocol built on the Terra chain. Investors who deposited UST in the Anchor Protocol were receiving a 19.45% yield that was paid out from Terra's reserves. Due to such a high-yielding mechanism of the Anchor Protocol, some critics raised concerns that Kwon's stablecoin model could function like a "ginormous Ponzi scheme". Mirror Protocol was another project based on the Terra chain, which designed and offered financial derivatives that virtually "mirrored" actual listed stocks.

History 
In 2018, Do Kwon and Daniel Shin (also known as Shin Hyun-sung) co-founded Terraform Labs in Seoul, South Korea. In 2019, Terraform Labs launched its first cryptocurrency token. Terraform Labs raised more than $200 million from investment firms such as Arrington Capital, Coinbase Ventures, Galaxy Digital and Lightspeed Venture Partners.

In January 2022, the Luna Foundation Guard (LFG) was established as a non-profit based in Singapore, with Do Kwon serving as its director. Terraform Labs allocated a portion of the money obtained from UST sales to Luna Foundation Guard, to be used as reserves to stabilise the price of UST. As of 7 May, just before UST broke its peg, LFG held reserves of 80,394bitcoin worth approximately $2.4billion. Bitcoin was the largest portion of the reserve assets, though LFG also held reserves in various other stablecoins and cryptocurrencies.

In February 2022, Terra and the Washington Nationals Major League Baseball team announced they had entered into a sponsorship agreement which provided stadium and television branding, as well as the rebranding of the Washington Nationals club and lounge to the "Terra Club". The deal was originally proposed to the Terra community by Kwon, referring only to an unnamed "sports franchise in one of the four major American professional sports leagues", and the community agreed to pay $38.15million for a five-year-long exclusive partnership.

The founders Kwon and Shin each owned one share of Terraform Labs, giving each founder 50% of controlling power. Kwon later enlarged his stock pool to eleven shares, giving him approximately 91.7% ownership and Shin the remaining 8.3%. Shin and Chai Corporation, a Terra-ecosystem payment service company that he founded, announced on 18 May 2022 that Shin no longer held any ownership stock in Terraform Labs. However, after it was revealed from sources of the Singaporean Account and Corporate Regulatory Authority that Shin still held 8.3% of Terraform Labs ownership, Chai Corporation announced that Shin was not able to "finish liquidating his remaining ownership in time" despite having the same share of ownership as of 18 May. The documents from the Singaporean authority also revealed that as of 18 May, Shin held 51.2% of ownership and Kwon 22.4% of Chai Holdings, the parent company of Chai Corporation.

Collapse 
Beginning on 9 May 2022, the tokens made headlines after UST began to break its peg to the US dollar. Over the next week, the price of UST plunged to 10 cents, while Luna fell to "virtually zero", down from an all-time high of $119.51. Before the crash, Luna was one of the top ten largest cryptocurrencies on the market. The collapse wiped out almost $45billion of market capitalisation over the course of a week.

On 13 May, Terraform Labs temporarily halted the Terra blockchain in response to the falling prices of UST and Luna. Despite the company's attempts to stabilise UST and Luna via its bitcoin and other cryptocurrency reserves from the Luna Foundation Guard, the 1:1 peg of UST to USD did not materialise. , blockchain analysts claim that the usage of the bitcoin reserves of LFG  still remains largely uncertain.

Likely causes of the collapse included mass withdrawals from the Anchor Protocol days before the collapse, investor concerns about cryptocurrencies more generally, and a drop in the price of bitcoin. During the collapse, holders converted Terra into Luna via the mint-and-burn system, which caused the price of Luna to collapse due to its increased supply. This in turn destabilised the balancing mechanism between the currencies.

On 25 May, a proposal was approved to reissue a new Luna cryptocurrency and to decouple from and abandon the devalued UST stablecoin.  The original blockchain is now called Terra Classic (LUNC), and the original Luna token is called Luna Classic. The new Luna coin is called "Terra 2.0" by investors, and has lost valuation in the opening days of being listed on exchanges.

In an August 2022 interview on the NFTV series Coinage, which occurred few months following the collapse Terra founder Do Kwon remarked that irrational with his level of confidence with the Terra blockchain system before the collapse. However, he would also deny that the Terra system was a ponzi scheme.

Licensing and regulatory issues 
Terraform Labs Pte. Ltd., the company behind Terra, is incorporated in Singapore but did not submit an application for a licence under the Payment Services Act according to The Straits Times. It is also not a notified entity, meaning it has not been granted temporary exemption from holding a licence by the Monetary Authority of Singapore. According to documents filed by Kwon at the Supreme Court of Korea's Registry Office, Kwon filed to dissolve the company's Korean entity on 30 April 2022, and was granted approval on 4 May 2022.

The U.S. Securities and Exchange Commission (SEC) issued a subpoena to Terraform Labs and Kwon in 2021, with specific regard to Terraform Labs' Mirror Protocol, which designed and offered financial derivatives that virtually "mirrored" actual listed stocks. Kwon responded by stating that he wouldn't comply with the demands, and instead would be suing the SEC. Despite Kwon's attempts to dispute and avoid investigations from the SEC, a U.S. Court hearing in Manhattan in February 2022 ruled in favour of the SEC's right to continue its investigation into Kwon and Terraform Labs. In February 2023, the SEC charged Terraform Labs and Kwon with fraud.

On 18 May, the newly appointed Korean Minister of Justice, Han Dong-hoon, enlarged the economic crimes investigation division of the Seoul Southern District Prosecutor's Office, vowing to "track illegal funds and capital transfers, crack down on tax evasion, audit company finances, compile transaction data, and seize the proceeds of criminal financial activity." On its first day of operation, the Financial and Securities Crimes Joint Investigation Team singled out the Luna and Terra crisis as its first investigation target.

A class action, Patterson v. TerraForm Labs Pte Ltd. et al, was filed against Terraform Labs and others in the United States District Court for the Northern District of California on 17 June 2022. In September 2022, a $56.9 million class action was filed at the High Court of Singapore against Do Kwon, Terraform Labs, Nikolaos Alexandros Platias and the Luna Foundation Guard.

In June 2022, Yonhap News reported that 15 people, including former Terraform developers for the Anchor lending protocol, had been imposed with travel restrictions by the Korean government. On November 29, 2022 an arrest warrant was issued for Daniel Shin by South Korean prosecutors.

References

External links 
 Anchor Protocol whitepaper

2018 software
Blockchains
Cryptocurrency projects
Currencies introduced in 2019